The Great Britain women's water polo team is a water polo team that represented Great Britain at the London 2012 Olympics, where they made their Olympic debut.

Results

Olympic Games
2012 — 8th place

World Championship
1986 — 9th place
2003 — 16th place
2013 — 13th place

European Championship
2012 — 7th place
2014 — 8th place

European Games
2015 — 11th place

Roster

References

External links
Official website

Women's water polo in the United Kingdom
Women's national water polo teams